Brush Brook flows into the Little Delaware River by Bovina Center, New York.

References

Rivers of New York (state)
Rivers of Delaware County, New York
Tributaries of the West Branch Delaware River